The Irani (meaning Iranian) are an ethno-religious community in the Indian subcontinent; they descend from the Zoroastrians  who emigrated from Iran to British India in the 19th and 20th centuries. They are culturally, linguistically, ethnically and socially distinct from the Parsis, who – although also Zoroastrians – immigrated to the Indian subcontinent from Greater Iran many centuries prior, starting with the Islamic conquest of Persia.

Distinction from Parsis
The Parsis and Iranis are considered legally distinct. A 1909 obiter dictum relating to the Indian Zoroastrians observed that Iranis (of the now defunct Bombay Presidency) were not obliged to uphold the decisions of the then regulatory Parsi Panchayat. Some of the Irani community speaks an ethnolect called Zoroastrian Dari whereas most Parsis typically speak Gujarati and Marathi. However, the two communities increasingly intermarry and are said to have been "integrated well" with each other.

History

Although the term 'Irani' is first attested during the Mughal era, most Iranis are descended from immigrants who left Iran and migrated to the Indian subcontinent during the late 19th and early 20th centuries. At the time, Iran was ruled by the Qajars and religious persecution of Zoroastrians was widespread. Some Iranis still speak Persian and the Dari dialects of the Zoroastrians of those provinces. Iranis are generally seen as a subset of the wider Zoroastrian community.

As is also the case for the Parsis, the Iranis predominantly settled in the west coast of India, in the states of Gujarat and Maharashtra. A concentration of their people live in and around the cities of Mumbai and Pune.

See also
 Irani café

References

Ethnic groups in India
 
Surnames
Zoroastrianism
Indian people of Iranian descent
Culture of Mumbai